Lou Island is an island of the Admiralty Islands, part of the Bismarck Archipelago, located in northern Papua New Guinea. 

Lou Island has four main villages: Rei, Lako, Baon and Solang. 

Admiralty Islands
Islands of Papua New Guinea